Villard was a French automobile manufacturer between 1925 and 1935.

Beginnings
The first 4HP Villard was constructed in 1923. It appeared to be a late-comer to the Cyclecar boom that had followed the First World War. It had only three wheels, with the single wheel, at the front, providing both the traction and the steering.

Launch
The car made its public debut in October 1924 at the 19th Paris Motor Show, priced by the manufacturer at 4,950 francs.   In 1925 the Société des Automobiles Villard was registered.

Middle period
Four years later the vehicle on the show stand at Paris was again a three wheel cycle car with a  wheelbase and a single cylinder two-stroke engine, but the engine capacity was now given as 350cc.  Many of these little three-wheeler cyclecars used bodies adapted for use as small delivery vans.

Later years
In 1927 a small number of four wheeled cars were produced:   these used a chain drive to deliver power to the front wheels.   Now a 500cc V4-cylinder was also available.

Reading list 
 Harald Linz, Halwart Schrader: Die Internationale Automobil-Enzyklopädie. United Soft Media Verlag, München 2008, . (German) 
 George Nick Georgano (Chefredakteur): The Beaulieu Encyclopedia of the Automobile. Volume 2: G–O. Fitzroy Dearborn Publishers, Chicago 2001, . (Englich)
 George Nick Georgano: Autos. Encyclopédie complète. 1885 à nos jours. Courtille, Paris 1975. (French)

Sources and notes 

Defunct motor vehicle manufacturers of France
Vehicle manufacturing companies established in 1925
Cyclecars
Vehicle manufacturing companies disestablished in 1935
1935 disestablishments in France
French companies established in 1925